Year 1176 (MCLXXVI) was a leap year starting on Thursday (link will display the full calendar) of the Julian calendar, the 1176th year of the Common Era (CE) and Anno Domini (AD) designations, the 176th year of the 2nd millennium, the 76th year of 12th century, and the 7th year of the 1170s decade.

Events 
 By place 

 Byzantine Empire 
 Summer – Emperor Manuel I (Komnenos) assembles a Byzantine expeditionary force, and marches towards Iconium, the Seljuk capital. Meanwhile, hordes of Seljuk Turks destroy crops and poison water supplies, to make Manuel's march more difficult, and harass the Byzantine army, in order to force it into the Meander Valley. Kilij Arslan II, ruler of the Sultanate of Rum, hears of the expedition, and sends envoys to ask for peace.
 September 17 – Battle of Myriokephalon: The Seljuk Turks defeat the Byzantine forces led by Manuel I, who are ambushed when moving through a narrow mountain pass near Lake Beyşehir. The Byzantines are dispersed and surrounded. They suffer heavy casualties and their siege equipment is destroyed. Manuel flees in panic and is forced to sign a peace treaty with Kilij Arslan II.

 Europe 
 May 29 – Battle of Legnano: The Imperial army (some 5,500 men) led by Emperor Frederick I (Barbarossa) is defeated by forces of the Lombard League, leading to the pactum Anagnium (the Agreement of Anagni).

 England 
 Spring – Assize of Northampton: King Henry II establishes the rules for the administration of criminal justice that he has set out in 1166 at Clarendon.
 Winter – An international bardic festival at Cardigan Castle in Wales. The first recorded eisteddfod.

 Egypt 
 Al-Adil I, Ayyubid governor of Egypt, suppresses a revolt by the Christian Copts in the city of Qift, hanging nearly 3,000 of them on the trees near the city.

 Levant 
 Spring – Saladin defeats the Zangid forces before Damascus and marries Nur al-Din's widow Asimat. On June 24 he accepts a truce and is recognized as the sovereign over Syria.
 Summer – Saladin ends his siege of the Ismaili ("Assassins") fortress of Masyaf, which is commanded by Rashid al-Din Sinan. 
 Autumn – William of Montferrat (Longsword) marries the 16-year-old Princess Sibylla, sister of King Baldwin IV (the Leper).
 Raynald of Châtillon is released and ransomed from prison in Aleppo, together with Joscelin III, the titular count of Edessa.

 Asia 
 Unkei, a Japanese sculptor, completes his Dainichi Nyorai (Enjō-ji) statue, now a National Treasure of Japan.

 By topic 

 Religion 
 Autumn – Frederick I makes peace with Pope Alexander III and recognizes his legitimacy as pope of the Catholic Church.
 Sens Cathedral in Burgundy installs an horologe, presumed to be an early form of clock.
 The Carthusians are approved as a religious order.

Births 
 October 15 – Leopold VI, German nobleman (d. 1230)
 Agnes of Hohenstaufen, German noblewoman (d. 1204)
 Al-Mu'azzam Isa, Ayyubid ruler of Damascus (d. 1227)
 Anna Komnene Angelina, Nicene empress  (d. 1212)
 Fujiwara no Nobuzane, Japanese painter (d. 1265)
 Hachijō-in Takakura, Japanese waka poet (d. 1248)
 Henry de Bohun, 1st Earl of Hereford (d. 1220)
 Hugh de Lacy, 1st Earl of Ulster (approximate date)
 Maud le Vavasour, English noblewoman (d. 1225)
 Theresa of Portugal, queen of León (d. 1250)
 William Longespée, 3rd Earl of Salisbury (d. 1226)

Deaths 
 April 18 – Galdino della Sala, Italian archbishop (b. 1096)
 April 20 – Richard de Clare, English nobleman (b. 1130)
 May 8 – David FitzGerald, bishop of St. Davids (b. 1106)
 May 13 – Matthias I, duke of Lorraine (b. 1119)
 July 20 – Yoshika, Japanese empress (b. 1141)
 August 23 – Rokujō, emperor of Japan (b. 1164)
 September 1 – Maurice FitzGerald, English nobleman
 September 17 
 Baldwin of Antioch, French nobleman
 John Kantakouzenos, Byzantine general
 October 12 – William d'Aubigny, English politician (b. 1109)
 Ahmad ibn Muhammad Sajawandi, Persian chronicler
 Chekawa Yeshe Dorje, Tibetan Buddhist monk (b. 1102)
 Constance of France, French princess (approximate date)
 Fujiwara no Teishi, Japanese noblewoman (b. 1131)
 Jaksa Gryfita, Polish nobleman and knight (b. 1120)
 John Doukas (Komnenos), Byzantine governor (b. 1128)
 Klængur Þorsteinsson, bishop of Skálholt (b. 1102)
 Margrethe of Roskilde, Danish noblewoman and saint 
 Michael Aspietes, Byzantine nobleman and general
 Rosamund Clifford (the Fair), mistress of Henry II
 Sancha Ponce de Cabrera, Spanish noblewoman
 Volodar Glebovich, prince of Minsk (approximate date)

References